Bnaya is a moshav in central Israel. Located in the westernmost portion of the Shephelah near Ashdod, Gedera and Yavne, it falls under the jurisdiction of Brenner Regional Council.

History
The village was founded in 1949 by Jewish immigrants from Czechoslovakia, Hungary, Poland and Romania, and was initially named Yavne HaDromit (יבנה הדרומית, lit. Southern Yavne) due to its location south of the town. However,  later  after a process of metathesis of the word "Yavne" the name was changed to Bnaya, named after "an officer under David" mentioned in 1 Chronicles 11:22, a member of the tribe of Simeon (1 Chronicles 4:36) dwelling in this area.

References

Moshavim
Populated places established in 1949
Populated places in Central District (Israel)
1949 establishments in Israel
Czech-Jewish culture in Israel
Hungarian-Jewish culture in Israel
Polish-Jewish culture in Israel
Romanian-Jewish culture in Israel
Slovak-Jewish culture in Israel